Tarek Ayad (born 19 October 1972) is a Libyan judoka. He competed in the men's half-lightweight event at the 2000 Summer Olympics.

References

1972 births
Living people
Libyan male judoka
Olympic judoka of Libya
Judoka at the 2000 Summer Olympics
Place of birth missing (living people)